Khanum, Hanum, Khanom, or Khanoum is a female royal and aristocratic title that was originally derived through a Central Asian title, and later used in the Middle East and South Asia. It is the feminine equivalent of the title Khan for a sovereign or military ruler, widely used by medieval nomadic Turkic peoples living in Asia and Europe and also Mongol tribes living north and northwest of modern-day China. In the construction of words of the Turkic languages, the suffix "-um / -ım" adds "my", making the word "Khanum" as "my Khan". This arises from the tale, depicting a Khan announcing to his subjects I am your Khan, and She is my Khan (Khanum). "Khan" is also seen as a title in the Xianbei confederation for their chief between 283 and 289. The Rourans were the first people who used the titles Khagan and Khan for their emperors, replacing the Chanyu of the Xiongnu, whom René Grousset and others assume to be Turkic.

In Modern Turkish, it is spelled Hanım. The title of Hanımefendi is a combination of the words Khanum (tr. Hanım) and efendi.

Today, the term is used as a way to respectfully address women of any social rank. "Khanum" is the eastern equivalent of "madam", or more colloquially, "ma'am".

In South Asia, particularly in Afghanistan, Khyber Pakhtunkhwa, Sindh, Baluchistan and North India, Khanum has been adapted for use as an honorific for Muslim women of high social status.

See also
Begum
Hanım
Khatun

References 

Noble titles
Women's social titles
Royal titles
Bengali words and phrases
Bengali Muslim surnames